Sam Otto (born 13 June 1991) is a British actor who gained popularity in 2017 after playing "Jalal" in Peter Kosminsky's Channel four Series The State. He is also known for starring in Collateral, The Flood, The Boy with the Topknot and Snowpiercer.

Early life
Otto was born in Basingstoke. He first got into Television and Film acting in 2017 starring in The State (2017 TV series) as Jalal. He trained at Drama Centre London. Otto attended St Augustine's Catholic College in Trowbridge.

Acting career
Sam Otto starred in The Boy with the Topknot as "Young Sathnam's Father", before starring in the 2018 movie The Flood as Josef. Otto's most recognizable role is "Jalal" in Peter Kosminsky's Channel four series The State about young Islamic State of Iraq and the Levant recruits, chronicling their journeys into endorsement of the caliphate on the one hand, and into disillusionment and despair on the other. Otto then went on to star in TNT's 2020 thriller series Snowpiercer, as John "Oz" Osweiller, a young brakeman and police-type figure of the train.

References

External links

1991 births
Living people
21st-century British male actors
British male television actors
Male actors from Hampshire
People from Basingstoke